Pamidighantam Sri Narasimha (born 3 May 1963) is a judge of the Supreme Court of India. He is former Additional Solicitor General of India. He is well known for his work on the Ayodhya Title Dispute and the BCCI cases.

Career
Narasimha was brought up in Hyderabad. After receiving a Bachelor of Laws in 1988 he started practice in Andhra Pradesh High Court. His father Kodanda Ramayya was also a judge and legal writer. Narasimha then moved to New Delhi to practice at the Supreme Court. He was designated as Senior Advocate and was appointed as Addl. Solicitor General of India in 2014. In August 2021 he became a judge of Supreme Court. He is in line to become the 56th Chief Justice of India, if the convention of seniority is followed.

References 

1963 births
Living people
21st-century Indian judges
Additional Solicitors General of India
Indian lawyers
Justices of the Supreme Court of India
People from Hyderabad, India
Senior Advocates in India